Belgachia West Assembly constituency was a Legislative Assembly constituency of Kolkata district in the Indian state of West Bengal.

Overview
As a consequence of the orders of the Delimitation Commission, Belgachia West Assembly constituency ceases to exist from 2011.
 
It was part of Calcutta North East (Lok Sabha constituency).

Members of Legislative Assembly

Results

1977-2009 Belgachia West
In the 2006 state assembly elections, Mala Saha of Trinamool Congress won the Belgachia West assembly seat defeating her nearest rival Rajdeo Goala of CPI(M). In 2001, 1996 and 1991, Rajdeo Goala of CPI(M) defeated Dr. Sudipta Roy of Trinamool Congress, Sadhan Das of Congress and Sudipto Roy of Congress respectively. Sudipto Roy of Congress won the seat in 1987 defeating Lakshmi Charan Sen of CPI(M). In 1982, Rathindra Nath Roy of CPI(M) defeated Amarendra Nath Bhattacharya of Congress. In 1977, Lakshmi Charan Sen of CPI(M) defeated Bhupendra Nath Sengupta of Congress.

1951-1972 Belgachia
During the period there was only one seat for Belgachia. Ganapati Sur of Congress defeated Lakshmi Charan Sen of CPI(M) in 1972. Lakshmi Charan Sen of CPI(M) defeated Ganapati Sur of Congress in 1971, Suchit Kumar Sur of Congress in 1969 and Ganapati Sur of Congress in 1967.Ganesh Ghosh of CPI won the seat defeating Ganapati Sur of Congress in 1962, Nandalal Banerjee of Congress in 1957 and in independent India's first election in 1951 defeating Sudhir Kumar De of Congress.

References

Former assembly constituencies of West Bengal
Politics of Kolkata district